A dado rail, also known as a chair rail or surbase, is a type of moulding fixed horizontally to the wall around the perimeter of a room.

The dado rail is traditionally part of the dado or wainscot and, although the purpose of the dado is mainly aesthetic, the dado rail may provide the wall with protection from furniture and other contact. Traditionally, the height of the dado rail is derived from the height of the pedestal of a column of classical order, typically  from the floor or about one-fifth the height of the room. Modern trends have been towards 36 inches or 900 mm, based on the assumption that its purpose is to protect the wall from chair backs. The term 'chair rail' is also used for this reason.

Dado rails are also sometimes applied to a wall without the full dado treatment. The purpose of the rail in these cases may be protective, and it is common in environments where walls are subject to much wear and tear, such as shopping centres and hospitals. In such cases the height of the rail is often 1200 mm or even 1500 mm from the floor and serves a functional rather than aesthetic role.

References

External links
The Misused & Confused Chair Rail by Brent Hull, December 3, 2010, at This Is Carpentry

Ornaments
Woodworking